Roy Adrien Richardson (born 5 April 1963) is a former Sint Maartener cricketer.

A right-handed batsman and right-arm medium pace bowler, Richardson was selected in Sint Maarten's squad for the 2006 Stanford 20/20, playing in their preliminary round loss to the United States Virgin Islands (USVI). His debut at the age of 43 years and 97 days makes him one of the oldest players to appear in Twenty20 cricket. Batting at number nine, Richardson was dismissed for 9 runs by Sherville Huggins, while in the USVI innings he bowled one over which conceded 11 runs, but failed to take a wicket. This marks Richardson's only appearance in Twenty20 cricket.

See also
List of Sint Maarten Twenty20 players

References

External links
Roy Richardson at ESPNcricinfo
Roy Richardson at CricketArchive

Living people
1963 births
Sint Maarten cricketers
Sint Maarten representative cricketers